"Boa vs. Python" is the debut single by Test Icicles from their debut album For Screening Purposes Only. It was released on 1 August 2005. The song peaked at No. 46 on the UK Singles Chart.

Track listing
CD: Domino / DNO 76 - U.S.

CD: Domino / RUG205CDP - UK

7": Domino / RUG205 - UK

12": Domino / DNO 76 - U.S.

Charts

References

2005 debut singles
Test Icicles songs
Domino Recording Company singles
2005 songs